First Presbyterian Church is a historic church located at 120 East State Street in Trenton, Mercer County, New Jersey, United States. The church's first congregation got together in 1712 and their first church was built in 1726. The church building and churchyard cemetery were added to the National Register of Historic Places for their significance in architecture, politics, religion, and social history on September 9, 2005.

History and description
The current church was built in 1839 and is the third one at this site. It was designed by architect Horatio Nelson Hotchkiss with Greek Revival style and features two Ionic columns. Cemetery plots are located to the east and west of the building.

Former pastors
 David Cowell, 1732–1760
 James Waddel Alexander, 1829–1832
 John William Yeomans, 1834–1841
 Henry Collin Minton, 1891–1902

Notable interments
Colonel Johann Rall, commander of the Hessian troops during the Battle of Trenton, was buried in an unidentified grave in the churchyard of this church, with an inscription dedicated to his memory.

See also
National Register of Historic Places listings in Mercer County, New Jersey
List of Presbyterian churches in the United States

References

External links
 
John Hall, Mary Anna Hall, History of the Presbyterian Church in Trenton, N.J.: from the first settlement of the town (MacCrellish & Quigley, printers, 1912) Available Online
First Presbyterian Church of Trenton Official Website

Churches on the National Register of Historic Places in New Jersey
Churches completed in 1839
Churches in Trenton, New Jersey
Presbyterian churches in New Jersey
National Register of Historic Places in Trenton, New Jersey
New Jersey Register of Historic Places
19th-century Presbyterian church buildings in the United States
Stone churches in New Jersey